The First Abe Cabinet governed Japan under the leadership of Prime Minister Shinzo Abe from September 2006 to September 2007. The government was a coalition between the Liberal Democratic Party and the Komeito and controlled both the upper and lower houses of the National Diet.The cabinet faced policy issues regarding government debts and the shrinking population. 

At a joint press conference Hakuo Yanagisawa, who was appointed Minister of Health, Labor and Welfare, spoke to a number of issues including reform of the Social Insurance Agency, measures against the decline in the birthrate, the unification of the Employees Pension Plan and the Mutual Pension Plan for public servants, and revision of labor-related laws.   

At the onset Prime Minister Abe's approval rating was 70%, but dropped to 30%  prior to the 2007 House of Councilors election, which resulted in the LDP losing the Upper House to the Democratic Party of Japan and becoming the second party for the first time in its history. Abe subsequently resigned, citing health reasons. Abe was criticized for not explaining his thinking enough to show where Japan was going.

Background 

Abe was elected to the House of Representatives in 1993, and by 1999 was serving as Director of the Committee on Health and Welfare, and as Director of the Social Affairs Division of the Liberal Democratic Party.  In 2003, Abe was elected Secretary General of the Liberal Democratic Party, and two years later became Chief Cabinet Secretary.

Abe took office as the first Japanese Prime Minister born in the postwar period.

Election of the Prime Minister 

Abe succeeded Prime Minister Junichiro Koizumi. He maintained Koizumi's emphasis on the U.S.-Japan alliance as the basis of national defense, but he wanted Japan to be a more equal partner. One goal of his administration was to revise Japan's constitution to normalize the use of military force.

Lists of Ministers 

R = Member of the House of Representatives
C = Member of the House of Councillors

Cabinet 

Abe announced his Cabinet on September 26, 2006. The largest Mori faction in the Liberal Democratic Party received the most appointments.

Changes 
 December 28, 2006 – Regulatory Reform Genichiro Sata resigned and was replaced by Yoshimi Watanabe.
 January 9, 2007 – A new position of Defense Minister was created, Fumio Kyūma was appointed the inaugural minister.
 May 28, 2007 – Agriculture Minister Toshikatsu Matsuoka committed suicide and was replaced by Norihiko Akagi.
 July 3, 2007 – Defense Minister Fumio Kyūma resigned and was replaced by Yuriko Koike.
 August 1, 2007 – Agriculture Minister Norihiko Akagi committed suicide and was replaced by Masatoshi Wakabayashi.

Reshuffled Cabinet

Changes 
 September 3, 2007 – Agriculture Minister Takehiko Endo resigned and was replaced by his immediate predecessor Masatoshi Wakabayashi.

References

External links 
Pages at the Kantei (English website):
 Abe Administration 
 List of Ministers 
 (Reshuffled)

Shinzo Abe
Cabinet of Japan
2006 establishments in Japan
2007 disestablishments in Japan
Cabinets established in 2006
Cabinets disestablished in 2007